Courtside College Basketball is a 1984 video game by Haffner.

Gameplay
Courtside College Basketball is a text-based sports simulation of statistics.

Reception
In 1996, Computer Gaming World declared Courtside College Basketball the 149th-best computer game ever released.

References

External links
Review in Compute!'s Gazette
Article in Computer Gaming World
Review in Supercommodore (Italian)

1984 video games
College basketball video games in the United States
Commodore 64 games
Video games developed in the United States